José Anigo (born 15 April 1961) is a French football former manager and former defender.

Career
Anigo was born in Marseille, and after a tough childhood went on to play for his home town club for eight years where he established a reputation for being a tough defender. After that he became the coach for Marseillaise's youth team and latter went on to become coach from 2001 to 2005 leading the team to a runners up medal in the 2004 UEFA Cup Final. During his tenure he also signed many stars that would aid Marseille in the future such as playmaker Mathieu Valbuena, goalkeeper Steve Mandanda and defender Nicolas N'Koulou.

In October 2019, Anigo was hired as Head of International Recruitment for Nottingham Forest. He left the club in June 2020.

Personal life
Born in France, Anigo's parents were Spanish Republicans on the run from Francisco Franco. In September 2013 Anigo's son Adrien Anigo was shot dead. Adrien had previously spent time in prison for robbery. and became the fifteenth victim of gun violence in Marseille that year.

References

External links
 Stats

1961 births
Living people
Footballers from Marseille
French footballers
French people of Spanish descent
Association football defenders
Expatriate football managers in Tunisia
Espérance Sportive de Tunis managers
French expatriate sportspeople in Tunisia
Ligue 1 players
Ligue 2 players
Olympique de Marseille players
Nîmes Olympique players
French football managers
Olympique de Marseille managers
Ligue 1 managers
US Marseille Endoume players
French expatriate sportspeople in Greece